Six national football teams from Central America competed in the 1995 UNCAF Nations Cup (Copa Centroamericana). The winning team was Honduras, defeating Guatemala in the final.

Squads

Preliminary round

Stadium

First round

Group A
played in San Salvador

Group B
played in Santa Ana

Knockout stage

Semi-finals

Third-place match

Final

Champions

Honduras, Guatemala and El Salvador qualified automatically for 1996 CONCACAF Gold Cup.

External links
https://web.archive.org/web/20110514025907/http://www.rsssf.com/tablesg/gold-cam95.html

 
1995 in Central American football
1995
1995
1995–96 in Salvadoran football
1995–96 in Costa Rican football
1995–96 in Honduran football
1995–96 in Guatemalan football